Martin Haywood (born 7 October 1969) is an Australian former cricketer. He played thirteen first-class and ten List A matches for New South Wales between 1991/92 and 1996/97.

See also
 List of New South Wales representative cricketers

References

External links
 

1969 births
Living people
Australian cricketers
New South Wales cricketers
People from Tamworth, New South Wales
Cricketers from New South Wales